Manglerud is a rapid transit station on the Lambertseter Line of the Oslo Metro. It is served mainly by line 4 and by line 1 trains on weekdays between 06:00 and 19:00. It is located between Høyenhall and Ryen,  from Stortinget.

The station was opened as a tram station in 1957, and as a subway station on 22 May 1966. The architect was Edgar Smith Berentsen.

References

External links

Oslo Metro stations in Oslo
Railway stations opened in 1957
1957 establishments in Norway